June Martel (born Martha Irene Greif; November 19, 1909 – November 23, 1978) was a singer and a stage and motion picture actress from Chicago, Illinois. She was a petite brunette.

Singer and actress
Her career began as a singer in Atlantic City, New Jersey. Martel was in the cast of the Broadway (Manhattan) play, Snatch as Snatch Can, in May 1934. Other actors paired with her included Barton MacLane. Her first film role was in Front Page Woman (1935) followed by Going Highbrow (1935). The latter starred Guy Kibbee. She was the female lead in Fighting Youth (1935). Playing the part of "Betty Wilson'," Martel starred opposite Charles Farrell and Andy Devine.  The movie combined football excitement with the influence of communism on college athletics.

Martel was signed by Harry Warner of Warner Bros. in 1935. Other aspiring Warners' actresses were Olivia de Havilland, June Grabiner, Nan Grey, and Dorothy Dare. By August 1936 she had become the property of Paramount Pictures. The studio cast her as the ingenue in American Plan. The story concerned a girl who inherits a newspaper, adapted from an unpublished play by Manny Seff and Milton Lazarus.  She also appeared in Sitting on the Moon in 1936.

Martel's final screen roles came in the late 1930s, in western films. Among these are Forlorn River (1937), Wild Horse Rodeo (1937) and Santa Fe Stampede (1938).

Personal life
She collected odd pieces of jewelry and had amassed a small trunkload of items by 1937. In February 1941 Martel married screenwriter Frank Fenton. Fenton was also a scenarist and magazine writer. Her first husband was Walter J. Klavun, a Yale University graduate, whom she divorced in
Mexico in 1938.

June Martel died in 1978 in Los Angeles County, California.

Filmography

References
 Los Angeles Times, News Notes of Broadway Stage, May 29, 1934, Page 10.
 Los Angeles Times, June Martel In New Picture, January 5, 1935, Page 5.
 Los Angeles Times, Ten On Road To Stardom, April 1, 1935, Page A2.
 Los Angeles Times, June Martel's Debut, May 6, 1935, Page 14.
 Los Angeles Times, More Newcomers Crash Pictures, August 28, 1936, Page 15.
 Los Angeles Times, She Collects Jewelry, May 30, 1937, Page C3.
 Los Angeles Times, June Martel Becomes Bride of Film and Magazine Writer, March 1, 1941, Page 3.
 Los Angeles Times, Cupid Scores Knockout Blow Over Divorce Among Motion Picture Folk Of Hollywood, January 2, 1942, Page 7.
 New York Times, The Screen, November 2, 1935, Page 13.
 Reno Evening Gazette, Fine Screen Bill For Granada Announced, Saturday, November 9, 1935, Page 8.

External links

 

American stage actresses
American film actresses
Western (genre) film actresses
Actresses from Chicago
20th-century American actresses
1909 births
1978 deaths
20th-century American singers
20th-century American women singers